Yondaung may refer to several places in Burma:

Yondaung, Bhamo
Yondaung, Mingin